An , literally "cheering squad" or "cheering section", is a Japanese sports rallying team similar in purpose to a cheerleading squad in the United States, but relies more on making a lot of noise with taiko drums, blowing horns and other items, waving flags and banners, and yelling through plastic megaphones in support of their sports team than on acrobatic moves (though some ōendan incorporate pom-pom girls). In addition to cheering for their own teams, ōendan have been known to lead fans in cheers which tease and taunt the other team and its fans. This is usually done in the spirit of good competition, but occasional fights have broken out if the taunting gets too heated.  Smaller ōendan are sometimes called .

Introduction

Ōendan or ōenbu can be found in high schools, colleges, and universities, as well as in non-academic settings such as intercompany sports clubs, professional sports fan clubs, and so on. Many schools hold competitions during their sports day events, and students often spend weeks perfecting their presentations after being divided up into teams.

Many members of an ōendan will dress in long happi and wear hachimaki emblazoned with team logos, inspirational sayings, or the names of their favorite players, something adopted by some fans of Japanese idol groups.

Especially with professional baseball teams, the ōendan for each team will come up with unique cheers to help the fans become involved. These cheers will often change depending on who the opposing team is. On occasion, the fans themselves will come up with a new cheer that is then adopted by other fans and their team's ōendan.

See also
Hiatari Ryōkō!, a manga and anime series in which one of the main characters is a member of the high school ōendan.
Osu! Tatakae! Ouendan, a game for the Nintendo DS in which the player participates in an ōendan.
Moero! Nekketsu Rhythm Damashii Osu! Tatakae! Ouendan 2, the sequel to Osu! Tatakae! Ouendan.
Elite Beat Agents, a North American Nintendo DS game based on Osu! Tatakae! Ouendan.
Pom squad
Sakigake!! Otokojuku, a manga and anime series in which all of the characters are taught how to participate in ōendan.
Cheer Sticks
Again!!, a manga series by Mitsurou Kubo which focuses on Imamura trying to help his school ōendan.

References

External links

 Science of Baseball: Besuboru: page 3
 Japanese Baseball from The Japan Project

Cheerleading
High school sports in Japan
Articles containing video clips